William Webbe (fl. 1542), of Warwick Castle, Warwick, was an English politician.

He was a Member (MP) of the Parliament of England for Warwick in 1542.

References

Year of birth missing
Year of death missing
People from Warwick
English MPs 1542–1544